Marcelo Rodríguez (born July 22, 1969) is a Venezuelan actor and professional wrestling announcer currently working for the international Spanish versions of WWE shows Raw, SmackDown, NXT, and pay-per-view (PPV) events alongside Carlos Cabrera as color commentator.

Rodríguez started working for WWE by the end of 1998 as the host of Los Super Astros and appeared only occasionally at that time, filling in for Cabrera or former color commentator Hugo Savinovich. He commentated in every international version of RAW and SmackDown, while both Cabrera and Savinovich alternately broadcast alongside him. In October 2011, Savinovich left WWE and Rodríguez became a full-time Spanish commentator for all programs and  PPV events. In October 2011, Rodríguez and Cabrera were at ringside for the tapings of Raw and SmackDown in Mexico City, Mexico.

Rodríguez was also frequent substitute co-host of WWE en Español until October 2011, when he became permanent co-host with Carlos Cabrera following the departure of Hugo Savinovich from the company. He had not made any appearance on PPV since working for WWE until SummerSlam 2011. Rodríguez hosts The WWE Experience for Latin America introducing clips and recaps from the previous week's episodes of Raw, SmackDown and NXT.

In his spare time, Rodriguez enjoys following the NHL's New Jersey Devils and the NFL's Dallas Cowboys.

Rodríguez graduated from the Central University of Venezuela with a degree in journalism and has worked as an actor, singer, dancer, playwright and director. Some of his theater credits in leading roles include: “Don Juan Tenorio” (Don Juan); “Mozart, the Angel Amadeus” (Amadeus); “The Tempest” (Fernand); “A Widow for Four” (Arlequin); “Spring Awakening” (Melchor Gabor); “Yerma” (Juan); “Absalom's Tresses” (Amon); “Wounded Buffalo” (Don); “Lorca in a Green Dress” (Lorca ensangrentado), and the musicals “Panteleón and the Visitors” (Sinchi), “La Verdadera Historia de Pedro Navaja” (El Lince) and “¿Quién mató a Hector Lavoe?,” (Announcer) the longest running Spanish-language show in the history of Broadway. He has worked internationally with theater companies such as Rajatabla, the Compañía Nacional de Teatro de Venezuela (inaugural cast), the Compañía Nacional de Teatro de España, Repertorio Español (in more than two dozens of plays) and Teatro Círculo of New York and has enjoyed the privilege of being onstage in every continent.

He has been honored with several acting recognitions such as Premio Nacional del Artista and Premio Municipal (Venezuela), the Critic’s Circle Award (in Puerto Rico), and HOLA, ACE and Premios Sin Límite (in New York). Some of his film credits in leading roles include “Atraco en el Aeropuerto” and “Tacagua”. Rodríguez has recorded three albums with WEA International, Sonorodven and Sonografica. He played the leading role for the VPG infomercial show “Caminos al Jaguar”, which was filmed in six countries. Some of his television credits include soap operas as Cara Sucia, Cristal, La Revancha, for Venevisión-Univisión.

In 2006, Rodríguez also became the winner of the Nuestras Voces National Playwriting Competition with his play “Cartas a una Madre” (originally “Bestalia”) which was produced with a great success at Repertorio Español, company that he also belongs as a current cast member. “Cartas a una madre” was published by the end of 2012. In 2009 and 2010, he also placed among the finalist of Nuevas Voces with his plays “La Papaya Dulce” and “Los Súper Héroes del Abuelo”.

In 2017, Rodriguez was invited by Amazon Sports Nutrition to be the Spanish host at the Mister Olympia Competition. Also in 2017, after many years without recording another full album, Marcelo Rodriguez launches his fourth musical project: "Verde", whose profits are used for the Yolanda Laprea Foundation and its activities in aid of the elderly.

External links
 Official website
 Marcelo Rodríguez`s profile at WWE.com

References

1969 births
Living people
People from Caracas
Professional wrestling announcers
Central University of Venezuela alumni
Venezuelan male actors